The Journal of Historical Geography is a quarterly peer-reviewed academic journal covering historical geography and environmental history published by Elsevier. According to the Journal Citation Reports, the journal has a 2014 impact factor of 1.028.

References

External links 
 

Quarterly journals
English-language journals
History of geography journals
Elsevier academic journals
Historical geography